Hugh Jones (November 10, 1880 – May 1, 1960) was an American tennis player. He competed in the men's singles and doubles events at the 1904 Summer Olympics.

References

External links
 

1880 births
1960 deaths
American male tennis players
Olympic tennis players of the United States
Tennis players at the 1904 Summer Olympics
Tennis players from St. Louis